Eliza Sam (born 17 November 1984) is a Canadian actress based in Hong Kong, formerly under contract in TVB. She won the Miss Chinese Vancouver Pageant in 2009, and went on to win the 2010 Miss Chinese International Pageant.

After winning the Miss Chinese Vancouver title 2010, Sam was involved supporting organizations such as the Canadian Cancer Society and S.U.C.C.E.S.S. She won the World Chinese Entrepreneur Scholarship in January 2010, hosted by The 4th World Chinese Entrepreneurs Convention, Canada Founding & Development Society.

Biography

Early life
Sam's family are Hoa, with parents of Chinese descent from Vietnam, and grandparents from Guangdong and Fujian. She was born and raised in Vancouver, Canada. Sam had also stated publicly that she is a Christian.

Sam graduated from Surrey's Kwantlen Polytechnic University in 2010, with a bachelor's degree in Business as well as a diploma in Marketing Management and a diploma in Fashion Design and Technology. She was an English teacher prior to participating in Miss Chinese International.

Career
After winning the Vancouver pageant, Sam represented Vancouver in the Miss Chinese International Pageant 2010 organized by TVB. During her final speech (which was to void points from the previous performance segments), Sam talked about her Cantonese being weak, and thus spending one year to practice and improve her Cantonese. She won the competition under the new voting system. Later, she signed with TVB. With her role in the 2012 drama Divas in Distress, Sam rose to popularity and got her nickname "Princess Heung Heung" (香香公主).

In 2013, Sam won the Most Improved Female Artiste award at the 2013 TVB Anniversary Awards.

In mid-June 2018, Sam announced on her social media that her eight-year contract with TVB had come to an end.

In February 2020, Sam returned to TVB to film the family drama  Plan "B", which was broadcast in June 2021.

Personal life 
In October 2015, Sam was revealed by the media that she was dating a 6-feet-tall and robust man. On 2 December 2016, she openly acknowledged her engagement on social media with her out of industry boyfriend Joshua Ngo. The manager company acknowledged and blessed them. The couple's wedding was held in Vancouver on 18 December 2016.

On 6 December 2018, Sam announced on social media that she was 5 months pregnant and her due date was April 2019.

On 25 March 2019, Sam posted a photo of her son Jacob on Instagram, announcing that her son was born under the name "BooBoo", but did not disclose the date of birth. Sam shared that Jacob's Chinese name is Ngo Chu-hin (吳主軒), which was given to him by her parents-in-law.

On 3 February 2021, Sam announced on social media that she was pregnant with her second child. On 13 May 2021, she announced on Instagram that her second son, Cashew (小腰果), was born under the name "JuJu", but did not disclose the date of birth.

Filmography

Television dramas

Music videos

Films
 The Fortune Buddies (2011)
 I Love Hong Kong 2012 (2012)
 Special Female Force (2016)
 I Love You, You're Perfect, Now Change! (2019)

TVB Programs
 Big Fun Canton 《千奇百趣省港澳》 (2011)
 Kansai Banzai 《關西風雨》 (2011)
 Miss Chinese International Pageant 2012 《國際中華小姐競選》 (Appearing as the reigning Miss Chinese International winner) (2012)
 Dolce Vita 《港生活·港享受(明珠生活)》 (2012)
 The Armur River 《黑龍江》 (2012)
 TV Funny 《玩轉三周1/2》 (2012)
 Neighborhood Treasures 4 《千奇百趣高B班》 (2012)
 Big Fun SE Asia 《千奇百趣東南亞》 (2012)
 Nat Around The World 《叻哥遊世界》 (2013)
 Feastival A La Stars 《明星愛廚房》 (2014-2015)
 A Starry Homecoming 《星星探親團》 (2016)
 My Handy Man 《乜都攪掂晒》 (2016)

Awards and nominations

 2010 World Chinese Entrepreneur Scholarship: Academic, community service and leadership award

|-
! colspan="3" style="background: #DAA520;" | Miss Chinese Vancouver
|-

|-

|-
! colspan="3" style="background: #DAA520;" | Miss Chinese International
|-

References

External links

 Miss Chinese Vancouver 2009 - Profile page
 Miss Chinese International 2010 - Profile page
Twitter

1984 births
21st-century Hong Kong actresses
Actresses from Vancouver
Canadian actresses of Hong Kong descent
Canadian emigrants to Hong Kong
Canadian film actresses
Canadian schoolteachers
Canadian television actresses
Hoa people
Hong Kong film actresses
Hong Kong television actresses
Hong Kong people of Hoa descent
Kwantlen Polytechnic University alumni
Living people
TVB actors
Canadian-born Hong Kong artists